Acting on Impulse is a 1993 American film directed by Sam Irvin and starring Linda Fiorentino, Nancy Allen, and C. Thomas Howell. The film, which is also known under the alternate titles Secret Lives and Eyes of a Stranger, premiered at the Seattle International Film Festival on June 3, 1993 before being broadcast by Showtime on July 10, 1993. Adam Ant, Isaac Hayes, Zelda Rubinstein, and Dick Sargent, in his last role, make cameo appearances.

Critical response
The Kansas City Star called Acting on Impulse "perverse fun", while Entertainment Weekly noted it as an "inevitable goofball thriller" and commenting on the relaxed nature of the sexual tension in the film.

References

External links
 
 

1993 films
American thriller drama films
1990s thriller drama films
1990s psychological thriller films
American erotic thriller films
Films about actors
1990s English-language films
Films scored by Daniel Licht
1993 drama films
1990s American films